John Wilkie (29 January 1877 – 19 June 1963) was a New Zealand cricketer. He played two first-class matches for Otago in 1901/02.

See also
 List of Otago representative cricketers

References

External links
 

1877 births
1963 deaths
New Zealand cricketers
Otago cricketers
Sportspeople from East Ayrshire
Scottish cricketers
Scottish emigrants to New Zealand